Calvados is a department in the Normandy region in northwestern France. It takes its name from a cluster of rocks off the English Channel coast. In 2019, it had a population of 694,905.

History
Calvados is one of the original 83 departments created during the French Revolution on 4 March 1790, in application of the law of 22 December 1789. It had been part of the former province of Normandy. The name "Orne-Inférieure" was originally proposed, but it was ultimately called Calvados after a group of rocks off its coast.

One popular legend ascribes its etymology to the Salvador, a ship from the Spanish Armada that sank by the rocks near Arromanches-les-bains in 1588. It is more likely, however, that the name Calvados was derived from calva dorsa, meaning bare backs, in reference to two sparsely vegetated rocks off its shore.

After the allied victory at Waterloo the department was occupied by Prussian troops between June 1815 and November 1818.

On 6 June 1944, the Allied forces landed on the beaches of the Bay of the Seine in what became known as the Battle of Normandy.

Geography
Calvados belongs to the region of Normandy and borders the departments of Seine-Maritime (maritime border), Eure, Orne and Manche. To the north is the Baie de la Seine, part of the English Channel. On the east, the river Seine forms the boundary with Seine-Maritime. Calvados includes the Bessin area, the Pays d'Auge and the area known as the "Suisse normande" ("Norman Switzerland").

The most notable places in Calvados include Deauville and the formerly elegant 19th-century casino resorts along the coast.

Economy
Agriculture dominates the economy of Calvados. The area is known for producing butter, cheese, cider, and Calvados, the apple spirit that takes its name from the area.

Politics
The President of the Departmental Council is the centrist Jean-Léonce Dupont, the former dominant figure of the right and centre in the department. The Conseil General of Calvados and Devon County Council signed a Twinning Charter in 1971 to develop links with the English county of Devon.

Presidential elections 2nd round

Current National Assembly Representatives

Demography

The inhabitants of Calvados are called "Calvadosiens" (male) and "Calvadosiennes" (female). In 2019, Calvados had 648,299 inhabitants, making it the 34th most populated French department.

Age distribution in Calvados (2019):
 75 years and older: 10.0%
 60–74 years old:  18.1%
 45–59 years old: 19.4%
 30–44 years old: 17.4%
 15–29 years old: 18.0%
 0–14 years old: 17.1%

Principal towns

The most populous commune is Caen, the prefecture. As of 2019, there are 6 communes with more than 10,000 inhabitants:

Culture
The Bayeux Tapestry is on display in Bayeux and makes the city one of the most-visited tourist destinations in Normandy.

Juno Beach Centre at Courseulles-sur-Mer, Calvados, commemorates the D-Day landing of the Canadian liberation forces at Juno Beach during World War II in 1944. The cult of Saint Thérèse de Lisieux brings large numbers of people on pilgrimage to Lisieux, where she lived in a Carmelite convent. Every September, Deauville hosts the Festival of the American Movie and the beach resort of Cabourg hosts the Festival of the Romantic Movie. Annually, the city of Caen celebrates the festival of the electronical cultures called "Nordik Impakt" and the festival of Beauregard, just around Caen.

The local dialect of the Norman language is known as Augeron. It is spoken by a minority of the population.

Tourism
Calvados is one of the most visited areas in France because of its seaside resorts which are among the most prestigious in France with their luxurious hotels, casinos, green countryside, manors, castles, the quiet, the chalk cliffs, the typical Norman houses, the history of William the Conqueror, Caen, Bayeux, Lisieux, the famous D-day beaches and numerous museums about the Second World War. Culinary specialties from the verdant countryside of Calvados are abundant: cider, calvados, camembert, and Pont-l'Évêque cheeses.

One of the advantage of Calvados is to be fairly near large urban centers (Paris, Ile de France). Calvados is therefore often preferred for holidays and for weekends and sometimes considered as the countryside of Paris.

Calvados, via the port of Ouistreham, is an entrance to the continent from Britain. There are two airports: Caen-Carpiquet and Deauville-Saint Gatien. The department of Calvados has several popular tourist areas: the Bessin, the Plain of Caen, the Bocage Virois, the Côte de Nacre, the Côte Fleurie and the Pays d'Auge. Several beaches of Calvados are popular for water sports, including Cabourg and Merville-Franceville-Plage.

Tourist capacity (2022):
 10,200 hotel rooms
 14,410 camping sites
 12,795 other beds (tourist resorts, holiday villages, rural gites, youth hostels)

Second homes
As of 2019, 17.9% of available housing in the department were second homes.

Sport
Aquatic sports are often played on the coasts and beaches, for example, kite surfing and beach volleyball. Stade Malherbe Caen is a professional football team from Caen, who currently play in Ligue 2.

See also
 Arrondissements of the Calvados department
 Cantons of the Calvados department
 Communes of the Calvados department

References

External links

 Departmental Council website 
 Prefecture website 

  
 Encyclopædia Britannica's guide to D-Day 

 
1790 establishments in France
Departments of Normandy
Normandy region articles needing translation from French Wikipedia
States and territories established in 1790